Kenneth Trebbe (born September 21, 1952) is an American country singer, known professionally as Kenny Starr.

Biography
He was born in Topeka, Kansas, United States, and grew up in Burlingame, Kansas. At the age of nine, he fronted his own group, the Rockin' Rebels, and in his teens he played at local clubs leading a pop group, Kenny and the Imperials. Later switching to country music, a win in a local talent contest led him to perform on a bill containing Conway Twitty and Loretta Lynn. Lynn encouraged his efforts and, with her support, Starr secured a recording contract with MCA Records.

He recorded for MCA between 1973 and 1978, charting 13 singles, and releasing one studio album. For much of the 1970s, he was a member of Loretta Lynn's touring band, the Coal Miners.

Starr's biggest hit was a cover of David Geddes's single "The Blind Man in the Bleachers". Starr's version was a hit single in the u.s on the country charts in 1976, reaching No. 2 on the Country Singles chart, and a hit on the pop charts peaking at No. 58 on the Billboard Hot 100 and went to No. 1 on the country chart in Canada. The album from which it was taken, also called The Blind Man in the Bleachers, reached No. 12 on the Billboard Country Albums chart.

Discography

AB-side to "The Calico Cat."

References

1952 births
Living people
American country singer-songwriters
Musicians from Topeka, Kansas
MCA Records artists
People from Burlingame, Kansas
Singer-songwriters from Kansas